MSV Normannia 08 is a German association football club from the city of Berlin. The club was established 1 October 1908 as Berliner Fußball-Club Normannia and adopted its current identity as Märkischer Sportverein Normannia 08 Berlin in 1988.

History 
Early in its history, the club flirted with failed partnerships. In 1911, they joined with SV Niederschönhausen for a year. They merged with BFC vom Jahre 1893 in 1918 to play as Sportvereinigung Normannia vom Jahre 1893 in another short-lived partnership lasting just a year. In 1928, they adopted the name Berliner Sportclub Normannia before later becoming Sportverein Normannia. Throughout this period and through to the end of World War II, the team played lower-tier local football.

The club briefly disappeared in the aftermath of the war when occupying Allied authorities banned organizations across the country, including sports and football clubs, a part of the process of denazification. New clubs soon emerged in the latter half of 1945 and the membership of Normannia was re-organized as Sportgruppe Nordost alongside a large part of the former membership of Nordiska Berlin. Normannia was re-founded on 15 April 1950 and resumed its place as a lower-tier local side. The club's greatest success came with their advance to the Amateur Oberliga Berlin (III) for a single season turn in 1971–72.

MSV Normannia 08 most recently played in the ninth tier Kreisliga Berlin A where a runners-up finish in 2015–16 took the club back up to the Bezirksliga.

References

External links 
  

Football clubs in Germany
Football clubs in Berlin
Association football clubs established in 1908
1908 establishments in Germany